The Campeonato Paraguayo de Fútbol Femenino, also known in Paraguay as Liga Femenina de Fútbol (Women's Football League) is the top level league competition for women's football in Paraguay. The winner and runner-up qualify for the Copa Libertadores Femenina, the South American Women's Champions League. The competition is organised by the Paraguayan Football Association.

Format 
The teams play a double round robin. After that the four best teams advance to the semi-finals. After participation in the late 2000s has declined to around 6 clubs, there were some seminars by the Football Organisation as how to increase participation. In 2011, 12 teams did enter the championship.

List of champions 
In 1997 an experimental tournament was held and won by Nacional. Then, from 1999, the competition was held annually, except for 2001. Universidad Autonoma won 9 times out of 13. Since at least 2004 an Apertura and Clausura format was adopted. The winners of those are not considered champions but play a playoff for the championship.

Titles by club

References

External links 
 Paraguayan Football Association - Portal on women's football

Women
Paraguay
League
Women's sports leagues in Paraguay